Piet-Hein Willem Geeris (born 29 March 1972 in Boxtel) is a former Dutch field hockey player, who played 194 international matches for the Netherlands, in which he scored 29 goals. The forward and midfielder made his debut for the Dutch on 5 May 1993 in a friendly match against Ireland. His last appearance in the Holland squad came just before the 2004 Summer Olympics in Athens.

Geeris played in the Dutch League for MEP, HC Tilburg, HC Den Bosch and Oranje Zwart. In between he also went to Italy, and played for Cernusco. He stopped competing at top level in the spring of 2004, and then continued playing in Belgium.

External links

 Dutch Hockey Federation

1972 births
Living people
Dutch field hockey coaches
Dutch male field hockey players
1998 Men's Hockey World Cup players
Field hockey players at the 2000 Summer Olympics
2002 Men's Hockey World Cup players
Olympic field hockey players of the Netherlands
Olympic gold medalists for the Netherlands
People from Boxtel
Sportspeople from North Brabant
Olympic medalists in field hockey
Medalists at the 2000 Summer Olympics
HC Den Bosch players
Oranje Zwart players
20th-century Dutch people